Zhang Qingpeng (born March 28, 1981 in Fushun, Liaoning) is a former Chinese professional basketball player who played as a point guard for the Beijing Shougang Ducks in the CBA. He also played for the Liaoning Dinosaurs and the Xinjiang Flying Tigers in the Chinese Basketball Association.

Chinese national team

He played as a point guard for the China men's national basketball team at the 2008 Olympics in Beijing.

Profile 
 Height: 188 cm (6'2)
 Weight: 84 kg (184.8 lb)
 University affiliation: Chengdu Institute of Physical Education

References

External links 
 Player profile at Asia-Basket.com

1981 births
Living people
Asian Games gold medalists for China
Asian Games medalists in basketball
Basketball players at the 2008 Summer Olympics
Basketball players at the 2010 Asian Games
Basketball players from Liaoning
Beijing Ducks players
Chinese men's basketball players
Liaoning Flying Leopards players
Medalists at the 2010 Asian Games
Olympic basketball players of China
People from Fushun
Point guards
Shandong Hi-Speed Kirin players
Xinjiang Flying Tigers players
2006 FIBA World Championship players